Fundella ignobilis is a species of snout moth in the genus Fundella. It was described by Carl Heinrich in 1945, and is known from Mexico and Texas.

References

Moths described in 1945
Phycitinae